Hanu Dhorajiya is a MLA from Lathi constituency in Gujarat for its 12th legislative assembly.

References

Living people
Bharatiya Janata Party politicians from Gujarat
Gujarat MLAs 2012–2017
People from Amreli district
Year of birth missing (living people)